The 1968 Giro d'Italia was the 51st running of the Giro d'Italia, one of cycling's Grand Tour races. The Giro started in Campione d'Italia, on 20 May, with a  stage and concluded in Naples, on 11 June, with a  mass-start stage. A total of 130 riders from 13 teams entered the 22-stage race, which was won by Belgian Eddy Merckx of the Faema team. The second and third places were taken by Italians Vittorio Adorni and Felice Gimondi, respectively.

Teams

At the route's announcement on 21 March, the organizers announced twelve teams of ten would participate; however, one more team (Peugeot) was later invited. Each team sent a squad of ten riders so the Giro began with a peloton of 130 cyclists. Out of the 130 riders that started this edition of the Giro d'Italia, a total of 98 riders made it to the finish in Naples where eight riders were subsequently disqualified for testing positive for drugs leaving the general classification tally at 90 riders. The starting peloton consisted of 70 Italians, 16 Belgians, 15 Frenchmen, 11 Spanish, 7 Swiss, four Germans, three Dutch, two Danes, one English, and one Luxembourgian rider. The presentation of the teams – where each team's roster and manager were introduced in front the media and local dignitaries – took place on 20 May, in the Campione d'Italia at 9:30 AM local time.

The teams entering the race were:

Pre-race favorites

The starting peloton did include the previous year's winner Felice Gimondi. Eddy Merckx was confirmed to participate with his Faema team. Eight-time Grand Tour winner Jacques Anquetil did not participate in the race because of a dispute over pay.

Route and stages

The race route was revealed to the public on 21 March 1968 by race director Vincenzo Torriani. The starting date of the event was moved from 18 or 19 May to the 20th because of the general election taking place within Italy that ended on 19 May. The race was broadcast by RAI throughout Italy. l'Unita writer Gino Sala's felt the route was geared towards climbers, referencing the inclusion of Tre Cime di Lavaredo which had been the previous year and eliminated several riders. Former racer Cino Cinelli felt the Tre Cime di Lavaredo would be the decisive stage, while three-time champion Gino Bartali felt the Spanish would benefit from the route. The second individual time trial, in San Marino, was seen as an important stage as it featured inclines of 5-6%. Gianni Motta commented that "I've never seen so many mountains in a row one after another." Four mountains approached or exceeded : Monte Grappa, Tre Cime di Lavadero, Rocca di Cambio, and Blockhaus. Following the route's unveil, El Mundo Deportivo author Juan Plans Bosch wrote that the Giro would always be second to the Tour de France as it was the first premier bike race, while he felt the Giro had better "historical and geographical illustrations."

To begin race festivities there was a parade through the streets of Campione d'Italia before the prologue started during the night. The race started with a  prologue, which consisted of a  circuit being crossed twice. The times from this stage were not included in the final times for the general classification, but were just done to determine the first person to wear the race leader's maglia rosa. This was the first Giro d'Italia to have a prologue to open the race. The 130 starting riders were divided into thirteen groups of ten, with each group of ten contesting the course at the same time. The times of the fastest riders from each group were put together and the fastest of those times was the rider that would wear the first pink jersey. The route finished for the first time in Naples near Mount Vesuvius along the Mediterranean Ocean.

Race overview

The race's twelfth stage saw heavy rain from the start of the stage in Gorizia, which turned to snow as the race began to elevate into the Dolomites. Police lined the sides of the roads of the Tre Cime di Lavaredo as the riders passed through due to incidents that occurred on the slopes the previous year. The leading group on the road had a ten-minute advantage on Eddy Merckx. Merckx was able to traverse the ten-minute gap, win the stage, and take the lead of the race.

Doping

At a presentation in Campione d'Italia, Torriani announced the measures for doping controls. This was the first Giro d'Italia to administer tests in attempt to catch riders doping, To determine whether a not tests would be administered, a set of twenty-two envelopes were made with each envelope having a slip of paper inside that read either "Yes" or "No". Following the finish of each stage one envelope was opened, if it read "No," then all riders could leave immediately. If it read "Yes," then riders with high placings on the stage and in the overall classification were tested. The results from these tests, however, would be available fifteen days after the conclusion of the race. On 15 June, the Italian Cycling Federation announced that nine riders had tested positive during the race. The riders were Gimondi, Motta, Franco Balmamion, Franco Bodrero, Raymond Delise, Peter Abt, Victor van Schil, Mariano Diaz, Joaquin Galera. Balmamion was cleared of the charges as the substance found in his urine had not been officially banned. Gimondi's ban was overturned on 13 July as he persuaded the authorities he had used Reactivan. Years later, author John foot wrote "Doubts remain about how much the influence of Gimondi's fame and his ability to employ expensive lawyers and experts had on his case," casting further doubt on the legitimacy of Gimondi's claims of innocence. The Tour de France organizers adopted the Giro's doping control scheme for their 1968 race.

Classification Leadership

Two different jerseys were worn during the 1969 Giro d'Italia. The leader of the general classification – calculated by adding the stage finish times of each rider – wore a pink jersey. This classification is the most important of the race, and its winner is considered as the winner of the Giro.

For the points classification, which awarded a red jersey to its leader, cyclists were given points for finishing a stage in the top 15. The mountains classification leader. The climbs were ranked in first and second categories. In this ranking, points were won by reaching the summit of a climb ahead of other cyclists. There were a total of nineteen categorized climbs, of which the highest one, the Cima Coppi, was the Tre Cime di Lavaredo. Although no jersey was awarded, there was also one classification for the teams, in which the stage finish times of the best three cyclists per team were added; the leading team was the one with the lowest total time.

Final standings

General classification

Points classification

Mountains classification

Traguardi a sorpresa classification

Team classification

Minor classifications

Franco Bitossi (Filotex) won the traguardi tricolori classification and Merckx won the Trofeo dei Circuiti.

References

Footnotes

Citations

Bibliography

1968
Giro d'Italia
Giro d'Italia
Giro d'Italia
Giro d'Italia
1968 Super Prestige Pernod